Judge Speer may refer to:

Alexander M. Speer, justice of the Supreme Court of Georgia
Emory Speer (1848–1918), judge of the United States District Court for the Southern District of Georgia
Jack Speer (1920–2008), judge of the Bernalillo County, New Mexico, Small Claims Court

See also
Albert Spear (1852–1929), judge and politician in Maine